Whiplash is a 1948 American film noir directed by Lewis Seiler and written by Kenneth Earl, Harriet Frank Jr., Maurice Geraghty and Gordon Kahn.  The film stars Dane Clark, Alexis Smith, Zachary Scott and Eve Arden.

Plot
The film opens with a middle-weight bout in Madison Square Garden, New York City, where Mike Angelo battles a seemingly superior opponent. He's going down for the count when he's saved by the bell. Cut to Mike Gordon, a happy-go-lucky painter in California, upset that cafe owner Sam has let customer Laurie Rogers buy a painting hanging on the wall. Mike is unsatisfied with his work and confronts Laurie to get it back. She convinces him it's good if not perfect, so Mike invites her to dinner.

After a romantic dinner and swim in the ocean, they've got a date for breakfast. When a shady character enters Sam's cafe, Laurie abruptly leaves town. At her hotel, Mike sees the painting wrapped and addressed to Dr. Vincent, New York City. Sam gives Mike money to go to New York.

Later, in his Greenwich Village artist's studio, Mike's neighbor Christine invites Mike out to the Pelican Club, a pricey night spot. Although Christine's plan to get him a portrait commission backfires, Laurie appears in a spotlight to sing. Mike goes to her dressingroom, where hoodlums attack him. He knocks one guy out, but gets hit over the head by a goon named Costello. He's carried unconscious to the boss's office.

Club owner Rex Durant, a crippled ex-boxer, is impressed that Mike just knocked out a middle-weight contender. Durant offers to make a champion of him. The only hitch: Laurie is actually Mrs. Durant. Mike resents Laurie's having lied to him. Next day at the gym, Mike is examined by Dr. Vincent, who's got the painting hanging in his office. He's Laurie's brother. 

Mike trains to be a prizefighter to get Laurie out of his system, becoming enmeshed in Durant's sadistic schemes. Dr. Vincent reveals that when he failed to fix Durant's legs after a car accident, Durant preyed on his guilt and manipulated Laurie into staying married. Dr. Vincent decides to kill Durant to liberate Laurie, but Mike thwarts him, confronting Durant himself. Costello gives Mike a concussion. A fight now would be suicide, but Durant promises Mike if he wins the big bout, Laurie will be free. Durant wants him dead because he knows Laurie loves Mike.

The extended flashback ends with Mike woozy and taking a beating at the Garden.  He nonetheless triumphs in the ring before being sent to the hospital. Dr. Vincent goes after Durant and is shot by Costello but manages to shoot Durant, whose wheelchair careens out of Madison Square Garden into an oncoming taxi.

Cut to Mike painting on the beach in California. Enter Sam to announce Laurie's arrival. They kiss on the cliff.

Cast
 Dane Clark as Michael Gordon
 Alexis Smith as Laurie Durant
 Zachary Scott as Rex Durant
 Eve Arden as Chris Sherwood
 Jeffrey Lynn as Dr. Arnold Vincent
 S. Z. Sakall as Sam
 Alan Hale as Terrance O'Leary
 Douglas Kennedy as Costello
 Ransom M. Sherman as Tex Sanders 
 Freddie Steele as Duke Carney 
 Robert Lowell as Trask
 Don McGuire as Markus

Reception
The New York Times film critic, Thomas M. Pryor, gave the film a negative review.  He wrote, "Good sense and dramatic construction went by the wayside in the filming of Whiplash and what is left on the screen is a pointless exposition of brutality, nicely demonstrated, however, by Mr. Clark and Zachary Scott, with Miss Smith providing suitable decoration. If it's plain, old fashioned mayhem that you desire, Whiplash most likely will be to your liking. Otherwise proceed with caution."

References

External links

 
  
 
 
 Whiplash information site and DVD review (includes images)
 

1948 films
1948 drama films
1940s sports films
American boxing films
American drama films
American black-and-white films
Film noir
Films directed by Lewis Seiler
Films scored by Franz Waxman
Films scored by William Lava
Warner Bros. films
1940s English-language films
1940s American films